Ryan L. Britton is a retired United States Air Force brigadier general who had served as the director of the Presidential and Executive Airlift Directorate of the Air Force Life Cycle Management Center. He previously was the director for global power programs at the Office of the Assistant Secretary of the Air Force Acquisition, Technology, and Logistics.

References

External links

Year of birth missing (living people)
Living people
Place of birth missing (living people)
United States Air Force generals
Date of birth missing (living people)